Sphegina kumaoniensis is a species of hoverfly in the family Syrphidae found in India, Thailand, and northeast Myanmar. It's characterized by a convex dorsal line of frontal prominence that ends clearly before the ocellar triangle as well as a mouthedge less strongly projecting, vibrissal angle less protruding or equal with the frontal prominence.

Etymology
The name comes the Kumaon division where it was originally discovered.

Related Species
S. kumaoniensis is very similar to S. uncinata and it's difficult to tell the two apart without reference to the male genitalia, in which they can be distinguished by S. kumaoniensis''' horn-like process of the baso-dorsal superior lobe (absent in S. uncinata), broad and latero-ventrally curved apical part of the superior lobe (in S. uncinata it's narrow and dorsally curved), and surstylus narrowed on the apical half with a concave medial margin (in S. uncinata it's short and evenly broad from dorsal view). S. kumaoniensis and S. uncinata'' both differ from other species in their genus by their dark pollinose brownish colour and their short, narrow abdomens.

References

Eristalinae
Insects described in 1998
Diptera of Asia